The Bromsgrove Sandstone is a geologic formation of the Sherwood Sandstone Group in England. It preserves fossils and ichnofossils of Chirotherium barthii, and Chirotherium sickleri, dating back to the Middle Triassic (Anisian) period.

Fossil content 

 Bromsgroveia walkeri
 Bromsgroviscorpio willsi
 Ceratodus laevissimus
 Cyclotosaurus leptognathus, C. pachygnathus
 Langeronyx brodiei
 Mesophonus perornatus, M. pulcherrimus
 Palaeosaurus cylindrodon
 Rhombopholis scutulata
 Spongiophonus pustulosus
 Stenoscorpio gracilis, S. pseudogracilis
 Willsiscorpio bromsgroviensis
 Acrodus sp.
 Dipteronotus sp.
 ?Gyrolepis sp.
 Mastodonsaurus sp.
 Archosauria indet.
 Dinosauriformes indet.
 Nothosauria indet.
 Rhynchosauridae indet.

See also 
 List of fossiliferous stratigraphic units in England

References

Further reading 
 M. J. Benton and A. D. Walker. 1996. Rhombopholis, a prolacertiform reptile from the Middle Triassic of England. Palaeontology 39(3):763-782
 M. J. King, W. A. S. Sarjeant, D. B. Thompson and G. Tresise. 2005. A Revised Systematic Ichnotaxonomy and Review of the Vertebrate Footprint Ichnofamily Chirotheriidae from the British Triassic. Ichnos 12(4):241-299
 E. N. Kjellesvig-Waering. 1986. A restudy of the fossil Scorpionida of the world. Palaeontographica Americana 55:1-287
 R. I. Murchison and H. E. Strickland. 1837. On the upper formations of the New Red System in Gloucestershire, Worcestershire, and Warwickshire; showing that the Red or Saliferous, including a peculiar band of sandstone, represent the "Keuper" or "Marnes irisées;" with some account of the underlying sandstone of Ombersley, Bromsgrove, and Warwick, priving that it is the "Bunter Sandstein" or "Grès bigarré" of foreign geologists. Transactions of the Geological Society of London, series 2 5(26):331-348
 L. J. Wills. 1910. On the fossiliferous lower Keuper rocks of Worcestershire, with descriptions of some of the plants and animals discovered therein. Proceedings of the Geologists' Association 21:249-331

Geologic formations of England
Triassic System of Europe
Triassic England
Anisian Stage
Sandstone formations
Geography of Worcestershire